Donavan Grondin (born 26 September 2000) is a French racing cyclist, who currently rides for UCI ProTeam .

Major results

Track

2017
 National Junior Championships
1st  Madison
2nd Elimination race
3rd Team pursuit
2019
 National Championships
1st  Omnium
1st  Madison (with Florian Maître)
1st  Team pursuit
3rd Scratch race
2021
 1st  Scratch race, UCI World Championships
 3rd  Madison (with Benjamin Thomas), Olympic Games
2022
 1st  Madison (with Benjamin Thomas), UCI World Championships
2023
 UEC European Championships
3rd  Madison (with Benjamin Thomas)
3rd  Points race
3rd  Scratch race

Road

2017 
 4th Chrono des Nations Juniors
 6th Overall Trophée Centre Morbihan
1st  Young rider classification
 7th Bernaudeau Junior
2018
 National Junior Championships
1st  Road race
3rd Time trial
 2nd Chrono des Nations Juniors
 6th Bernaudeau Junior
2022
 7th Grote Prijs Jean-Pierre Monseré
2023
 7th Classic Loire Atlantique

References

External links
 
 

2000 births
Living people
French male cyclists
French track cyclists
People from Saint-Pierre, Réunion
Olympic cyclists of France
Cyclists at the 2020 Summer Olympics
Medalists at the 2020 Summer Olympics
Olympic medalists in cycling
Olympic bronze medalists for France
UCI Track Cycling World Champions (men)